Alan MacDonald (born in 1958 in Watford) is a children's writer living in Nottingham, England.

Writing 
Alan MacDonald has worked in a team of writers on TV shows such as Tweenies, Horrid Henry and Fimbles. He is also the author of a number of books including ‘Triffic Chocolate’, the popular Dirty Bertie series with illustrator David Roberts, other works include The Sign of the Angel, Beware of the Bears and Pig in a Wig. He also wrote Gavin Peacock's biography, and many plays in his earlier career.

Television
Tweenies
Fimbles
Horrid Henry
Old MacDonalds Farm
The Shiny Show
Numberjacks
Sooty
The Roly Mo Show
Ni Ni's Treehouse
A House That’s Just Like Yours
Big Cook Little Cook
Boo!
Fun Song Factory
BB3B

References

External links 

 Bloomsbury Books: Author Biography

Living people
English children's writers
1958 births